The Kanpur Nagar Police Commissionerate (Hindi: कानपुर नगर पुलिस आयुक्तालय, popularly Kanpur Nagar Police) is the police department within the municipal limits of Kanpur. It is a part of Uttar Pradesh Police and has the primary responsibilities of law enforcement and investigation in Kanpur city.

It is headed by an IPS officer in the rank of ADG as its Commissioner of Police.

On 3rd November 2022, it was decided to include all 11 Police station of Kanpur outer police in Kanpur Nagar Police Commissionerate leading to 49 police stations.

History 
Before 2020, Kanpur Nagar district police came under Kanpur police zone and Kanpur police range of Uttar Pradesh Police. Kanpur zone is headed by an IPS officer in the rank of Additional director general of police (ADG), whereas Kanpur range is headed by an IPS officer in the rank of Inspector General of Police (IG).

Police Administration of Kanpur was headed by the Senior Superintendent of Police (SSP) who was an IPS officer. He was assisted by six Superintendents of Police (SP)/Additional Superintendents of Police (Addl. SP) (East, North, West, South, Traffic and Crime). The district was divided into twelve police circles, each responsibility of a Circle Officer (CO) in the rank of Deputy Superintendent of Police.

List of Head of Organization of Kanpur Nagar Police

Senior Superintendent of Police of Kanpur Nagar
Since Independence of the nation till 26th March 2021, 75 Indian Police Service officers have served as the head of organization of kanpur police as Senior Superintendent of Police (SSP).

Police Commissioner of Kanpur Nagar
On 26th March 2021, Government of Uttar Pradesh decided to make commissionerate in Kanpur Nagar city headed by rank of Additional Director of Police (ADG). Asim Arun was first Police Commissioner of Kanpur Nagar.

Organisation 
The Kanpur Commissionerate Police is headed by Commissioner of Police who is assisted by two Additional Commissioner of Police of i.e. Addl. CP Law & Order (IG) and Addl. CP Headquarters (DIG) . Police Commissionerate is divided into four police zones (East, West, Central and South), each headed by a Deputy Commissioner of Police which consists of 12 circles headed by Assistant Commissioner of Police and 34 police stations.

Police stations
Police stations under the jurisdiction of Kanpur Nagar Police Commissionerate are as follows:

 Anwar Ganj Police Station
 Armapur Police Station
 Babupurwa Police Station
 Badshahinaka Police Station
 Bajaria Police Station
 Barra Police Station
 Beconganj Police Station
 Bidhnu Police Station
 Bilhaur Police Station
 Bithoor Police Station
 Cantt. Police Station
 Chakeri Police Station
 Chaman Ganj Police Station
 Chaubepur Police Station
 Collector Ganj Police Station
 Colonelganj Police Station
 Fazalganj Police Station
 Govind Nagar Police Station
 Ghatampur Police Station
 Gwaltoli Police Station
 Harbans Mohal Police Station
 Juhi Police Station
 Kakadeo Police Station
 Kakwan Police Station
 Kalyanpur Police Station
 Kidwai Nagar Police Station
 Kohna Police Station
 Kotwali Police Station
 Maharajpur Police Station
 Mahila Thana Police Station
 Moolganj Police Station
 Narwal Police Station
 Naubasta Police Station
 Nawabganj Police Station
 Nazirabad Police Station
 Panki Police Station
 Philkhana Police Station
 Railbazar Police Station
 Raipurwa Police Station
 Saandh Police Station
 Sachendi Police Station
 Sajeti Police Station
 Shivrajpur Police Station
 Sisamau Police Station
 Swaroop Nagar Police Station

See also 
 Uttar Pradesh Police
 Lucknow City Police

References

External links

Kanpur Nagar district
Metropolitan law enforcement agencies of India
Uttar Pradesh Police
2021 establishments in Uttar Pradesh
Government agencies established in 2021